During the 2009–10 season, AFC Ajax participated in the Eredivisie, the KNVB Cup and the UEFA Europa League. The first training took place on 22 June 2009. The traditional AFC Ajax Open Day was on Wednesday 29 July.

Pre-season
The first training for the 2009–10 season was held on 22 June 2009. In preparation for the new season, Ajax organized a training camp in Amsterdam at the De Toekomst Sportpark. During the pre-season, the squad from manager Martin Jol played friendly matches against Ajax Cape Town, DWV, WKE and SV Huizen before traveling to England to play one against Bristol City and play Southampton for the Ted Bates Trophy. They then returned to Amsterdam to play Atlético Madrid and Benfica in the annual Amsterdam Tournament.

Player statistics 
Appearances for competitive matches only

|-
|colspan="14"|Players sold or loaned out after the start of the season:

|}
As of 24 October 2011

2009–10 selection by nationality

Team statistics

Eredivisie standings 2009–10

Points by match day

Total points by match day

Standing by match day

Goals by match day

Statistics for the 2009–10 season
 This is an overview of all the statistics for played matches in the 2009–10 season.

2009–10 team records

Topscorers

Placements

 Luis Suárez finishes as topscorer of the Eredivisie with 35 goals in 34 matches.
 Luis Suárez is voted Player of the year by the supporters of AFC Ajax.
 Toby Alderweireld is voted Talent of the year by the supporters of AFC Ajax.
 Martin Jol is nominated for the Rinus Michels Award 2010 in the category: Best Trainer/Coach in Professional Football.
 Luis Suárez ties the record of Mateja Kežman of most goals in the Eredivisie by a foreigner with 35 goals.
 Luis Suárez is voted Dutch Footballer of the Year by De Telegraaf and Football International.
 Gregory van der Wiel is voted Dutch Football Talent of the Year by De Telegraaf and Football International
 Demy de Zeeuw wins the Bronze boots award.

Competitions
All times are in CEST

Eredivisie

KNVB Cup

UEFA Europa League

Play-off round

Group stage

Knockout phase

Round of 32

Ted Bates Trophy

Amsterdam Tournament 

Final standings of the FWS Amsterdam Tournament 2009

Chippie Polar Cup 

Final standings of the Chippie Polar Cup 2010

Friendlies

Transfers for 2009–10

Summer transfer window
For a list of all Dutch football transfers in the summer window (1 July 2009 to 1 September 2009) please see List of Dutch football transfers summer 2009.

Arrivals 
 The following players moved to AFC Ajax.

Departures 
 The following players moved from AFC Ajax.

Winter transfer window
For a list of all Dutch football transfers in the winter window (1 January 2010 to 1 February 2010) please see List of Dutch football transfers winter 2009–10.

Arrivals
 The following players moved to AFC Ajax.

Departures
 The following players moved from AFC Ajax.

External links 
 Ajax Amsterdam Official Website in Nederlandse
 UEFA Website

Ajax
AFC Ajax seasons